The Governorates of Saudi Arabia, officially the Governorates of the Kingdom of Saudi Arabia, are the 136 governorates (second-level administrative division) that form the 13 emirates of Saudi Arabia. The governorates are classified into three categories according to the availability of services, population, geographical, security considerations, environmental conditions, and means of transportation, as provided by the Third Article of the Regions' System, issued on 27 Sha'baan 1412 AH (March 2, 1992) by Royal Order A/92, amended by Royal Order No. A/21 on 30 Rabi' al-Awal 1414 AH (September 17, 1993). These categories are: Capital (amānah), Category A and Category B.

The original number of governorates provided in the Regions' System (issued by King Fahd) was 118, although this was raised by King Abdullah in 2012 to 136. Each governorate is governed by a governor, who is assisted by a deputy governor. The governorates are further divided into centers, also referred to as sub-governorates.

List of Governorates

References

 
Subdivisions of Saudi Arabia
Saudi Arabia 2
Saudi Arabia 2
Governorates,Saudi Arabia
Saudi Arabia geography-related lists
Saudi Arabia